The Antiquarian Booksellers Association of Korea (ABAK), the national antiquarian book association of Korea, was founded in 1989 and joined the International League of Antiquarian Booksellers in 1990 during the Tokyo Congress, thus becoming its 18th member.

ABAK members adhere to the ILAB rules and regulations as well as its code of ethics. They aim to promote interest and friendship among members.

The ABAK organises a yearly antiquarian bookfair in Seoul. The market consists mainly of Korean early books and manuscripts.

The ABAK has at present 31 members.

See also
International League of Antiquarian Booksellers
Australian and New Zealand Association of Antiquarian Booksellers
Antiquarian Booksellers Association of Austria
Antiquarian Booksellers Association
Syndicat National de la Librairie Ancienne et Moderne (SLAM)
Antiquarian Booksellers' Association of America
Antiquarian Booksellers Association of Canada
Danish Antiquarian Booksellers Association
Belgian Antiquarian Booksellers Association
Antiquarian Booksellers Association of Japan
Nederlandsche Vereeniging van Antiquaren
Vereinigung der Buchantiquare und Kupferstichhändler in der Schweiz

External links
ABAK site 

Antiquarian booksellers
1989 establishments in South Korea